John William Chaffee (born 1948) is an American historian specializing in the history of China especially the Song dynasty. He is currently Distinguished Service Professor of History and Asian and Asian American Studies at Binghamton University.

Books

Chinese translation: 
Korean translation: 

Chinese translation: .

He also edited one volume of The Cambridge History of China (with Denis Twitchett).

References

External links

Binghamton University faculty
20th-century American historians
20th-century American male writers
1948 births
University of Chicago alumni
Historians from Anhui
American sinologists
Living people
Historians of China
American male non-fiction writers